"Lookin' at You" is the lead single released from Warren G's fourth album, The Return of the Regulator. Like his previous single, "Lookin' at You" was produced by his step-brother Dr. Dre and featured R&B Singer LaToiya Williams. To date, "Lookin' at You" is Warren G's last solo single to reach any of the Billboard charts; it peaked at #72 on the US R&B chart. The music video directed by Benny Boom features actresses Angelle Brooks & Daphne Duplaix & rapper WC.

Single track listing

A-Side
"Lookin'at You" (Radio Version)- 4:18
"Getaway"- 4:39

B-Side
"Somethin'to Bounce To"- 3:28
"Lookin'at You" (Album Version)- 4:15

Charts

2001 singles
Warren G songs
Song recordings produced by Dr. Dre
Music videos directed by Benny Boom
G-funk songs
Songs written by Warren G
2001 songs
Universal Records singles